Victoria was a steam ship built in 1902 by the Fairfield Shipbuilding & Engineering Company of Govan. She was employed by the Pacific Steam Navigation Company on their routes along the West coast of South America, from Valparaiso to Callao.

Design and Construction
Victoria was one of the four sister ships (and  being the other three) ordered by the Pacific Steam Navigation Company in early 1900s to serve their South American routes. The ship was launched on August 2, 1902, and commissioned later the same year.

The vessel was designed to carry as many passengers as possible given her size. On her main deck, besides quarters for the crew, there were accommodations for about 120 second-class and over 140 third-class passengers. On her spar-deck there were smoking and dining rooms for 30 second-class and about 70 first-class passengers. Her promenade deck boasted a spacious dining saloon for 130 and rooms for 42 first-class passengers. Overall, the vessel could accommodate 106 first, 104 second and 595 third class passengers.

Operational history
Upon entering the service Victoria was put on England to South America route and departed for her maiden voyage on March 5, 1903 to Valparaiso. Upon arrival at Valparaiso she was immediately put on the Callao route.

On July 23, 1908 Victoria sailed from Coronel at around 11:50 for Penco. At around 12:20 a dense fog set in the Bay of Arauco forcing the ship to reduce her speed. At 12:35 a whistle was heard on the starboard side, prompting the captain to order engines full stop. At 12:42 a steamer appeared in sight crossing from the starboard to port side. The engines were put in full speed astern but about 90 seconds later the ships collided. The ship, Victoria collided with, was 2,213 GRT Chilean steamer , on a passage from Tocopilla for Lota with a cargo of copper ore.  foundered almost immediately after the collision, but her crew was saved in their entirety by Victoria and landed at Coronel.

TBC

Notes 

1902 ships
Steamships of the United Kingdom
Merchant ships of the United Kingdom